Funny Valentine is the second studio album by avant-rock, experimental trio Massacre, recorded 17 years after the first. For this album guitarist Fred Frith and bass guitarist Bill Laswell were joined by English drummer Charles Hayward, who replaced original drummer Fred Maher. 

Funny Valentine was recorded at Laswell's studio, Orange Music, in West Orange, New Jersey in January of 1998.

Reception

In a review at AllMusic, Rick Anderson stated that Funny Valentine is a little "weak" at the beginning but improves as the album progresses. He said some of the tracks display "the sense of humor that animated so much of Killing Time". Anderson opined that Funny Valentine is "great", but not "quite as great" as Massacre's first album. He felt that it needs "a little more discipline and a little less length, but not much more discipline and not too much less length".

Track listing

Source: AllMusic, Discogs.

Personnel
Massacre
Fred Frith – guitar
Bill Laswell – bass guitars
Charles Hayward – drums

Sound and artwork
Robert Musso – engineer
Allan Tucker – mastering
Massacre – producer
Kazunori Sugiyama – associate executive producer
John Zorn – executive producer
Ikue Mori – design
Adolf Wölfli – artwork
Source: Discogs.

References

1998 albums
Massacre (experimental band) albums
Tzadik Records albums